Events in the year 2020 in the Marshall Islands.

Incumbents 

 President: Hilda Heine (until January 13) David Kabua (from January 13)
 Speaker of the house: Kenneth Kedi

Events 
Ongoing – COVID-19 pandemic in Oceania

 24 January – The country issued a travel advisory that required any visitors to the country to have spent at least 14 days in a country free of COVID-19.
 1 March – A previous travel ban was extended to China, Macau, Hong Kong, Japan, South Korea, Italy, and Iran.
 18 March – All incoming international travel was indefinitely suspended, as well as some intra-island flight services, as a result of the pandemic.
 14 September – It was announced that President David Kabua and the leaders of Palau, Kiribati, Nauru, and the Federated States of Micronesia will be hosting an in-person meeting. President of Nauru Lionel Aingimea said the leaders agreed to attend Palau's Independence Day on October 1 as the five Pacific countries remain free of COVID-19.
17 December – Marshall Islands police find a 5.5-meter (18-foot) fibreglass boat at Ailuk Atoll with 649 kilograms (1,430 pounds) of cocaine worth an estimated USD $80 million. This is the largest drug bust in Marshall Islands history.

Deaths

See also 
COVID-19 pandemic in the Marshall Islands
2020 in Oceania
2019–20 South Pacific cyclone season
2020–21 South Pacific cyclone season

References 

 
2020s in the Marshall Islands
Years of the 21st century in the Marshall Islands
Marshall Islands
Marshall Islands